Lunderston Bay is located on the east coast of the Firth of Clyde in Inverclyde, by the A770 road approximately midway between the town of Gourock and the village of Inverkip.

At low tide, most of the shore at the south end of the bay becomes exposed, revealing rocks and shingle. The tidal effect at the sandy beach at the north end of the bay is less visible. The Lunderston Burn enters the Firth of Clyde at the north end of the bay.

Beach and facilities 
There is a popular sandy beach, picnic areas and a wheelchair accessible playground at the north end of the bay, where a Clyde Muirshiel Regional Park ranger station, toilets and a car park are also located (the north end of the bay is within the regional park, but the south end is not). Lunderston Bay is a designated bathing water, with generally good water conditions during the bathing season. There are lifebuoy stations at the beach, but there are no lifeguards.

The junctions from the A770 Cloch Road to the bay car park and the garden centre were improved in early 2019. The improvements included the creation of bus stop bays and islands to provide a safer crossing point for pedestrians between the two sites. Bus times are available from the Traveline Scotland web site.

Coastal path 
The coastal path which runs through the bay area is part of the National Cycle Network. Route 753 starts at Route 75 in the centre of Gourock and continues south through the bay and Ardgowan Estate to Kip Marina and Inverkip where it terminates at the village war memorial. Eventually the path will continue to join the existing southern stretch of Route 753 which runs from Seamill to Ardrossan. The path follows the shoreline for most of the length of the bay and it is popular with walkers, joggers, cyclists and dog walkers all year round.

The coastal path at the bay is part of the Inverclyde Core Paths network (Sections 1B & 1C).

The path is also included in the Clyde Coastal Path (CCP), which itself is part of the Firth o Clyde Rotary Trail (FoCRT), which is a waymarked trail forming part of the more extensive International Appalachian Trail Scotland. The CCP to the south of the Erskine Bridge is looked after by the Rotary Club of Gourock, who provide signposts along the route.

Wildlife 
Gannets from the  distant Ailsa Craig can be seen diving for fish near the bay. Seasonal visiting birds include occasional Canada geese plus regular curlews and oyster catchers which can be seen foraging for lugworms and shellfish on the waterline. In winter, grebes, divers and other wildfowl can be found in numbers on the shoreline. At the quieter south end of the bay, grey seals, red shanks, cormorants, eiders and herons can be seen.

Cardwell Garden Centre 
Located on the east side of the A770 Cloch Road, opposite the ranger station, the garden centre at Lunderston Bay is one of the biggest in the UK, extending to over 19 acres of nursery and retail space, including a large restaurant. The centre has its own car park and toilet facilities, separate from those at the bay.

Lunderston Bay Photo Gallery

References

External links
Clyde Muirsheil
Lunderston Bay 
Cardwell Garden Centre

Bays of Scotland
Protected areas of Inverclyde
Landforms of Inverclyde
Firth of Clyde